Sports Complex station is a station of Busan Metro Line 3 in Geoje-dong, Yeonje District, Busan, South Korea..

External links

  Cyber station information from Busan Transportation Corporation

Busan Metro stations
Yeonje District
Railway stations opened in 2005